Georgia Voll (born 5 August 2003) is an Australian cricketer who plays as a right-handed batter and occasional right-arm off break bowler for the Queensland Fire in the Women's National Cricket League (WNCL) and the Brisbane Heat in the Women's Big Bash League (WBBL). Voll made her debut for the Queensland Fire in February 2020. She made her WBBL debut for the Brisbane Heat in the 2020–21 tournament. Voll has also played rugby league, representing the Queensland women's under-18 rugby league team.

In January 2022, Voll was named in Australia's A squad for their series against England A, with the matches being played alongside the Women's Ashes.

References

External links

Georgia Voll at Cricket Australia

2003 births
Living people
Australian women cricketers
Brisbane Heat (WBBL) cricketers
Queensland Fire cricketers
Place of birth missing (living people)